Livingston Township may refer to the following places in the United States:

 Livingston Township, Otsego County, Michigan
 Livingston, New Jersey

See also
 Livingston (disambiguation)

Township name disambiguation pages